Hashtag United Football Club is a semi-professional football club based in Essex, England.

Founded in 2016 by YouTube personality Spencer Carmichael-Brown, the club originally played exhibition matches against professional football clubs' staff teams, Sunday league teams and non-league teams. The games were filmed and highlights were uploaded to their YouTube channel, where they quickly gained a significant online following. In 2017, Spencer Owen began talks with the FA over the possibility of Hashtag United joining the non-league pyramid. The club subsequently entered the league system at the beginning of the 2018–19 season, joining the Eastern Counties League.

History
Hashtag United Football Club was formed in March 2016 by Spencer Carmichael-Brown, a football YouTuber who went by the name of Spencer FC. Carmichael-Brown had begun making YouTube videos in 2007 as a student at the University of Reading, and the team initially consisted of friends from school and university.

From their foundation, the team primarily played five, seven and eleven-a-side exhibition matches, which were filmed and uploaded to their YouTube channel. By September 2016, the team's Instagram account had over 100,000 followers, their Twitter account 41,000, and a 'penalty challenge' video uploaded to YouTube had accumulated over one million views. Hashtag United played various teams including a Comedians XI whom they beat 19–1, Google, the GB Deaf Team, Barawa and a Manchester City staff team, with opponents fielding former professional footballers such as Paul Dickov, Graeme Le Saux and Ray Parlour, and celebrities including Omid Djalili. At one point in 2016, the club was rumoured to be interested in signing professional footballer Adebayo Akinfenwa. In 2017 the club won the EE Wembley Cup, a competition that Carmichael-Brown had created in 2015. The team included Scott Pollock, who went on to sign professional terms with Northampton Town.

In early 2018, Chelsea player and Spanish international César Azpilicueta invested in the club and became a co-owner. Ahead of the 2018–19 season, the club joined the English football league system, initially being placed in Division One of the Spartan South Midlands League, before being moved to the Eastern Counties League after appealing that it was more suited to their Essex roots. After joining the pyramid, Carmichael-Brown stepped down as manager and was replaced by former East Thurrock United assistant manager Jay Devereux. Their first competitive match was a 3–2 away loss to Little Oakley on 4 August 2018. The club's first league season saw them reach the semi-finals of Division One Knock-Out Cup. They went on to win the Division One South title, earning promotion to the Essex Senior League. The 2019–20 season was abandoned due to the COVID-19 pandemic with the club second in the league, a point behind the leaders and with three matches in hand. After the 2020–21 season was also curtailed due to the pandemic, at which point Hashtag United were top of the league, the club was promoted to the North Division of the Isthmian League based on the points per game accumulated over the two abandoned seasons. During their two seasons in the Essex Senior League, the club won 96 points from 38 games.

In the 2022–23 season, the club had recorded 20 league wins in a row by March 2023.

Season-by-season record

Other teams
The club operates a Sunday league team, which was established in 2017 under the name West Oviedo and joined Division Two of the Brentwood Sunday League. They were runners-up in their first season and were promoted to Division One. They went on to win Division One in 2018–19. The club also had a team named Hashtag Academy that played in the seven-a-side Next Level Football League.

The club currently operates a reserve and development men's side as well as a number of development men's and women's youth teams. The youth section of the club was merged with Forest Glade for the start of the 2020–21 season. In April 2020 the club announced that they would have a women's team, Hashtag United Women, from the start of the 2020–21 season as a result of a merger with AFC Basildon. The women's team plays in the FA Women's National League, the fourth tier, and won the Essex County Cup in 2022 defeating Billericay Town 2-1 in the final.  The club also has an eSports team.

Colours and badge
Hashtag United's colours are yellow and blue. The club's first kit was a yellow shirt, with blue sleeves, shorts and yellow socks. In January 2017, the club signed a kit deal with Umbro until the end of 2018. This saw the club's colours changed to blue, with yellow streaks down the side of the shorts. The club's first shirt sponsor was EE. From 2017–18, the shirt sponsor was online game Top Eleven. The online gambling company 188 Bet were briefly the sleeve sponsor of the club. Ahead of the 2018–19 season, the club signed a new kit deal with Adidas, which saw the club's home shirt returned to the traditional yellow and blue they had originally worn. Ahead of the 2021–22 season, the club signed a new five–year kit deal with Hummel. This saw the kit's colours reversed again to be a blue shirt with yellow sleeves, blue shorts, and yellow socks. The away kit was predominantly white and black, featuring a blue lightning bolt design. The sponsor of the men's shirts was initially kept a mystery, with the shirts instead featuring a QR code that could be scanned to find clues about the upcoming sponsor. The sponsor was then revealed to be the upcoming free to play football simulator UFL (video game). The women's team were sponsored by food chain TGI Fridays.

The club's badge is yellow and blue, with the club's name emblazoned on the horizontal lines of a hashtag symbol.

Stadium
After joining the Eastern Counties League, the club began playing at the Coles Park Stadium, groundsharing with Haringey Borough. In April 2019, following promotion to the Essex Senior League, Hashtag United announced that the club would move to Tilbury's Chadfields for the 2019–20 season. In March 2020 the club stated that they would move to the Len Salmon Stadium, home of Bowers & Pitsea, for the 2020–21 season. Since the merger, the women's team played at Canvey Island's Park Lane ground; but in April 2022, it was announced that the Women's team would move to Aveley's Parkside Ground from the 2022-23 season.

Current squad

Men's team

Women's team

Staff

Honours

Men's
Eastern Counties League
Division One South Champions 2018–19

Women's
Women's Essex Senior Cup
Winners: 2021-22

See also
Hashtag United F.C. players

References

External links

Football clubs in England
Football clubs in London
Football clubs in Essex
Association football clubs established in 2016
2016 establishments in England
Sport in the London Borough of Haringey
Eastern Counties Football League
Essex Senior Football League
Isthmian League